Miyano is a Japanese surname. Notable people with the surname include:

, Japanese rower
Leland Miyano, artist, landscape designer and author born and raised in Hawai'i
Mamoru Miyano (born 1983), Japanese voice actor, actor, and singer
, Japanese bioinformatician
Tomochika Miyano, Japanese manga artist
Zenjiro Miyano, World War II flying ace

See also
Miyano-oku Station, a tram station in Kōchi, Kōchi Prefecture, Japan

Japanese-language surnames